Ainabkoi is a constituency in Kenya, one of six constituencies in Uasin Gishu County.

History 
Samuel Chepkonga in 2022

Election Results

2017 General Election

References 

Constituencies in Uasin Gishu County